Jefferson City Memorial Airport  is two miles (3 km) northeast of Jefferson City, in Callaway County, Missouri. It is owned by the City of Jefferson City.

Ozark DC-3s and M404s stopped there from 1954 until Columbia Regional Airport opened in 1968.

Facilities

For the 12-month period ending December 31, 2019, the airport had 34,909 aircraft operations, an average of 96 per day: 86.6% general aviation, 10.8% military and 2.5% air taxi. At that time, there were 59 aircraft based at this airport: 32 single-engine, 15 multi-engine, 9 jet,and 3 helicopters. 7 aircraft were military.

Accidents
On October 14, 2004 Pinnacle Airlines Flight 3701 crashed short of Jefferson City Memorial Airport; both persons on board were killed.

References

External links 
 Jefferson City Flying Service

Airports in Missouri
Buildings and structures in Jefferson City, Missouri
Buildings and structures in Callaway County, Missouri